Epimelitta viridimicans is a species of beetle in the family Cerambycidae. It was described by Fisher in 1952.

References

Epimelitta
Beetles described in 1952